Kilton may refer to several places in England:

 Kilton, North Yorkshire
 Kilton, Nottinghamshire
 Kilton, Somerset